Treasure Island 2023 (Treasure Island: Fans v Faves) is the seventh regular edition and the 13th season overall of the New Zealand reality-television series Treasure Island which returned to Mamanuca Islands, Fiji since Covid-19 pandemic. This season  premiered on January 30, 2023, and aired weekly, Monday to Wednesday, at 7:30 PM on TVNZ 2 and TVNZ+; hosted by Bree Tomasel and a new co-host Jayden Daniels. This season is the first season to include former seasons contestants and a winner since Superstars of Treasure Island in 2005, competed in charity challenges and a chance to win $50,000.

Matty Mclean won the treasure hunt on Day 15 and took $50,000 for Zeal NZ. Lana Searle and Dame Susan Devoy were the other two finalists. This season raised $120,000 across 9 various charities across New Zealand.

Castaways
Eight fans went head to head with eight celebrities from previous seasons, all looking for redemption and hungry for the win. The 16 castaways were initially separated into two tribes with Fijian names based on fauna of Fiji: Vai Vealoni (Fijian manta ray) and Beka Beka (Fijian monkey-faced bat).

Team Vai consisted of "The Fans" and Team Beka were "The Faves" of the show. On Day 1, Josh Oakley revealed to the cast that he was  Dame Susan Devoy's son. On Day 5, Matty McLean won the captain's test and chose Alex King to switch tribe. On Day 7, both tribes merged (Cokovata in Fijian) and become the most castaways within the camp in the show's history. The winner of the Day 8 face-off, Art Green, chose three castaways (instead of the usual two) for a double elimination challenge in the show history. Matty McLean won the final reward challenge which included $10,000 for his charity on Day 14.

Challenges

 
 The contestant was eliminated after their first time in the elimination challenge.
 The contestant was eliminated after their second time in the elimination challenge.
 The contestant was eliminated after their third time in the elimination challenge.
 The contestant was eliminated after the fourth or more time in the elimination challenge.

References

External links

Official Instagram 
Official Podcasts

TVNZ original programming
2023 New Zealand television seasons
New Zealand game shows
New Zealand reality television series
TVNZ 2 original programming
Television productions postponed due to the COVID-19 pandemic
2022 in Fiji
Television shows filmed in Fiji
Television shows set in Fiji